Zimbabwean Government Gazette is the official publication of the Government of Zimbabwe and publishes laws, ordinances and other regulations.

See also 

 List of government gazettes

References

External links 

 
 gazettes.africa/gazettes/zw/ (Unofficial: Republishes print publications)

Government of Zimbabwe